Gianluca Naso was the defending champion but lost to David Guez in the first round.
Andrej Martin defeated top-seeded João Sousa 6–4, 6–3 in the final.

Seeds

Draw

Finals

Top half

Bottom half

References
 Main Draw
 Qualifying Draw

Banca dell'Adriatico Tennis Cup - Singles
2013 - Singles